The Christian rock / pop group Superchick released their first album, Karaoke Superstars, in 2001 and they released a total of five full-length studio albums ending with the 2008's Rock What You Got with remix albums in 2003 and 2010. After the band broke up, they released a greatest hits album, Recollection, in 2013. The band released over a dozen singles from these albums, starting with "Barlow Girls". Eight of songs hit the Top 10 on at least one chart. Superchick's signature song, "Stand in the Rain", spend nine weeks at No. 1 on the R&R Christian CHR chart. Their final song was the 2013 remake of Plus One's "One Breath" under its subtitle "Five Minutes at a Time".

Albums

Studio albums
{|class="wikitable"
|-
! rowspan="2" style="width:33px;"| Year
! rowspan="2" style="width:215px;"| Album details
!colspan="2"| Peak chart positions
|-
! scope="col" style="width:3em;font-size:85%;"| US
! scope="col" style="width:3em;font-size:85%;"| US Christ
|-
| 2001
| Karaoke Superstars
 Released: May 22, 2001
 Label: Inpop
 Format: CD, DI
| style="text-align:center;"| —
| style="text-align:center;"| —
|-
| 2002
| Last One Picked
 Released: October 8, 2002
 Label: Inpop
 Format: CD, DI
| style="text-align:center;"| —
| style="text-align:center;"| —
|-
| 2005
| Beauty from Pain
 Released: March 29, 2005
 Label: Inpop
 Format: CD
| style="text-align:center;"| 126
| style="text-align:center;"| 6
|-
| 2006
| Beauty from Pain 1.1
 Released: July 18, 2006
 Label: Columbia
 Format: CD
| style="text-align:center;"| —
| style="text-align:center;"| 1
|-
| 2008
| Rock What You Got Released: June 24, 2008
 Label: Inpop
 Format: CD,DI
| style="text-align:center;"| 65
| style="text-align:center;"| 2
|}

Remix albums

Compilation albums

Singles

Other songs
 "Holy Moment" (Matt Redman Cover) - Unshakeable "Rockin' Around The Christmas Tree" - Rockin' Around the Christmas Tree Tour 2007 "Silent Night" - Rockin Around The Christmas Tree Tour 2007 "Love Is a Battlefield" (Pat Benatar Cover) - Live Love Tour 2006 "The Water Buffalo Song" - Veggie Rocks!In popular media
Superchick's songs have made over 70 placements in films, television, and video games.

Films
 "Get Up" was a part of
 Ice PrincessHoliday in the Sun Bring It On: In It To Win It "Not Done Yet" was also in the films Holiday in the Sun and Confessions of a Teenage Drama Queen.
 "One Girl Revolution" was used in:
 Legally Blonde Cadet Kelly Holiday in the Sun Cloud 9 "Na Na" was used in the film Confessions of a Teenage Drama Queen.
 "It's On" from the album Beauty From Pain appears on:
 Bring It On: In It To Win It Bring It On: Fight to the Finish the Cartoon Network movie Re-Animated Columbia Picture's movie Zoom Freaky Friday "Pure" was used in the Cartoon Network movie Re-Animated "Rock What You Got (Fight Underdog Fight Mix!)" was used in the movie Won't Back Down "This Is the Time" was used during the credits of God's Not Dead and the beginning of Invisible SisterTV shows
 "Get Up" was used in:
 the CBBC show "Sadie J" in the fourth episode titled "Slumberlicious"
 episode 20 "Anonymous" from Joan of Arcadia's first season
 "One Girl Revolution" was featured in season 1 episode "An Unexpected Call" of The Hills "Alright" was used at the start of Joan of Arcadia episode 19 Do The Math from season 1
 "Anthem" from the album Beauty From Pain was:
 used in the show Make It or Break It during season 1's fifth episode, "Like Mother, Like Daughter, Like Supermodel"
 selected to be the theme song for MTV's Real World/Road Rules Challenge: The Gauntlet 2.
 "We Live" is used as the theme song for the ABC series Brothers & Sisters.
 "Rock What You Got" was featured in:
 an episode of The Hills a radio commercial for E!'s reality show "Denise Richards: It's complicated"
 the show Make It or Break It during season 1's fifth episode, "Like Mother, Like Daughter, Like Supermodel"
 "Stand In The Rain" was featured as the trailer instrumental for the fifth season of The Hills.
 "So Beautiful" was featured:
 as the theme song for Running In Heels in a trailer of ABC's new show True Beauty.
 "Hey Hey" and "Alive" was used in the season finale of Make It Or Break It, 2010.
 "Still Here" was used in the Make It Or Break It episode titled 'Life or Death'.
 "Hero" was used as NBC's theme song in 2009.
 "Cross The Line" was featured in:
 the Make It Or Break It episode titled "To Thine Own Self Be True".
 an episode of The City.
 "One More" is featured in the hit drama "Make It Or Break It" season two finale episode titled "Worlds Apart", during Kaylie Cruz's floor routine. (SEAS2;EP20)
 Their music has been used as background music in the television show Making the Band''.

Video games

Superchick has a total of four songs which appear in the Dance Praise series.  Two can be found in Dance Praise 2: The ReMix, while two more are in the Contemporary Hits expansion pack:

Additionally, several Superchick songs were used in the PlayStation 2 video game S.L.A.I.: Steel Lancer Arena International

Music videos

References

Discographies of American artists
Pop music discographies
Christian music discographies